Air Quality Health Index (AQHI) is a type of air quality index.

Air Quality Health Index may refer to:
 Air Quality Health Index (Canada)
 Air Quality Health Index (Hong Kong)